Catherine Joan Bott (born 22 April 1995), usually known as CJ Bott, has represented New Zealand in association football at international level. She currently plays for Leicester City and has previously played with FF USV Jena, Vittsjö GIK, and Vålerenga.

Club career
In March 2022, Bott joined English club Leicester City.

International career
Bott was a member of the New Zealand U-17 side at the 2012 Women's World Championships, playing in two of New Zealand's group games.

At the 2014 Women's World Championships in Canada, Bott played in all three of New Zealand's group games and the quarter final match which they lost to Nigeria.

Bott made her senior début as a substitute in a 0–4 loss to Korea Republic on 10 March 2014.

She was part of New Zealand's squad for the 2015 FIFA Women's World Cup in Canada. She scored her first full international goal — a powerful strike from 35 metres — against Argentina at the 2019 Cup of Nations in Brisbane, Australia, on 3 March 2019.

She was also part of New Zealand's squad for the 2019 FIFA Women's World Cup in France, but broke her arm in the second game of the group stage against Canada.

International goals

References

External links

 Profile at NZF
 

1995 births
Living people
Association footballers from Wellington City
New Zealand women's association footballers
Women's association football defenders
Waterside Karori players
FF USV Jena players
Vittsjö GIK players
Vålerenga Fotball Damer players
Leicester City W.F.C. players
Frauen-Bundesliga players
Damallsvenskan players
New Zealand women's international footballers
2015 FIFA Women's World Cup players
2019 FIFA Women's World Cup players
New Zealand expatriate women's association footballers
New Zealand expatriate sportspeople in Germany
New Zealand expatriate sportspeople in Sweden
Expatriate women's footballers in Germany
Expatriate women's footballers in Sweden
New Zealand expatriate sportspeople in England
Footballers at the 2020 Summer Olympics
Olympic association footballers of New Zealand